This is a list of the members of the 15th Riigikogu, the unicameral parliament of Estonia, following the 2023 election.

Election results

Lists

By party

Estonian Reform Party (37)

Conservative People's Party (17)

Estonian Centre Party (16)

Estonia 200 (14)

Social Democratic Party (9)

Isamaa (8)

By votes

References

15th